Juan del Arco (born 29 November 1991) is a Spanish handball player who plays for Limoges Hand 87 and the Spanish national team.

He competed at the 2016 European Men's Handball Championship.

References

1991 births
Living people
Spanish male handball players
People from Leganés
Expatriate handball players
Spanish expatriate sportspeople in Qatar
BM Granollers players
Spanish expatriate sportspeople in France
Handball players from the Community of Madrid